Carrie Reichardt is a contemporary artist, who works from a studio in London, The Treatment Rooms. A member of  the Craftivism movement, Reichardt uses murals, ceramics, screen-printing and graphic design in her work. She is a dedicated advocate of the movement and curated one of the few exclusively Craftivist exhibitions in the UK.

Biography

Reichardt trained at Kingston University and received a degree in Fine Art from Leeds Metropolitan University. In 2009 she was invited to become Artist in Residence at Camberwell Art College as part of the Artists Access to Art Colleges programme. This initiative provides placements for visual artists and singers in higher and further education institutions across England.

She followed this by a period as Artist in Residence at the Single Homeless Project. She has exhibited at the Whitecross Street Party in Islington as part of her ongoing collaboration with the SHP.

Carrie Reichardt has spoken on the use of craft and art as protest, most recently for National Museums Liverpool’s International Women’s Day lectures in March 2012. She has also represented the UK as part of a group of international artists invited to mosaic the Argentinian Government building in Buenos Aires.

Notable work

Reichardt is best known for her anarchic crockery, where vintage floral, kitsch, royal and religious crockery is given a new twist by re-firing with layers of new ceramic decals. They are modified in a "radical use of traditional things", along with skulls, cheeky slogans and political statements.

 The Tiki Love Truck – commissioned by ‘Walk the Plank’, specialists in outdoor performance. This mosaic-covered pick-up truck, was dedicated to the memory of a death-row inmate. Winning first prize at the inaugural parade in Manchester, the truck has since participated in the Illuminated Parade in Blackpool, and the Glowmobile Parade in Gateshead.
 Trojan Horse –a life-sized resin horse, with a skull for a face and coated in a mosaic ofinformation about the abuse of horses, made in collaboration with sculptor, Nick Reynolds. This protest against equestrian cruelty was displayed at the Cheltenham Festival Races, an event symbolic of the British establishment and an international centre of horse racing. The project was featured in The Guardian
 The London Elephant Parade 2010 – Carrie’s mosaic elephant, ‘Phoolan’, was part of the largest ever public art event  – taking place outside London’s Natural History Museum
 The Milan Elephant Parade – this joint project with  Reynolds   was inspired by the revolutionary spirit spreading across the world and conveyed the message that ending capitalism is the only true way to save the elephant and the planet. The elephant was displayed outside the Triennale di Milano Museum of Art.
Mary Bamber, a  life-sized ceramic-adorned figure of the revolutionary socialist, Mary Bamber, now on permanent display at the Museum of Liverpool.

Carrie Reichardt’s work has featured in the press including, The Observer, The Guardian, The Evening Standard, Tile and Stone and in several books including; ‘1000 Ideas for Creative Reuse,’ Garth Johnson, ‘Mural Art No 2’, Kirikos Iosifidis and ‘The Idler 42 - Smash the System’ – Tom Hodgkinson.

References

External links 
Carrie Reichardt in The Guardian
Carrie Reichardt & Nick Reynolds discuss the Phoolan Elephant
Carrie Reichardt's Trojan Horse in The Guardian
Carrie Reichardt on Mary Bamber 

Living people
Year of birth missing (living people)
21st-century British artists
21st-century British women artists
Visionary environments
Alumni of Kingston University
Alumni of Leeds Beckett University